The 1985 Team Ice Racing World Championship was the seventh edition of the Team World Championship. The final was held on ?, 1985, in Inzell, Germany. Sweden won their first title.

Classification

See also 
 1985 Individual Ice Speedway World Championship
 1985 Speedway World Team Cup in classic speedway
 1985 Individual Speedway World Championship in classic speedway

References 

Ice speedway competitions
World